Fllakë is a village in the Durrës County, western Albania. At the 2015 local government reform it became part of the municipality Durrës. It is the site of the Fllakë transmitter. It is inhabited by Albanians and Vlachs. Its name refers to the Vlach presence.

References

Populated places in Durrës
Villages in Durrës County